Chahine van Bohemen (born 25 January 2004) is a Dutch-Moroccan professional footballer who plays as a defender for Jong Ajax of the Eerste Divisie.

Career
Born in the Netherlands to a Dutch father and Moroccan mother, Van Bohemen played locally as a child for VV Hoogland before he joined the academy of Vitesse Arnhem at ten years-old. He joined the AFC Ajax academy in 2019. He plays predominantly as a left-back and has gained a reputation for the ability to score direct from free-kicks.  In December 2022 van Bohemen announced his choice would be to represent Morocco internationally.

Van Bohemen made his professional debut for Jong Ajax against FC Eindhoven on 6 January 2023 in a 1-1 draw in the Eerste Divisie.

References

External links
 

Living people
2004 births
Dutch footballers
Eerste Divisie players
Dutch people of Moroccan descent
Jong Ajax players
Association football defenders